English singer Dido has won numerous awards and nominations throughout her career.

Billboard Music Awards 
{| class="wikitable sortable"
|-
! Year !! Award !! Nominee !! Result
|-
| rowspan=2|2001
| rowspan=3|Dido
| Top Female Artist
|rowspan=2 
|-
| Top Billboard 200 Artist - Female
|-
| rowspan=3|2004
| Top Adult Contemporary Artist
|rowspan=2 
|-
| "White Flag"
| Top Hot Adult Contemporary Track
|-
| "Stoned" (Deep Dish Remix)
| Top Hot Dance Club Play Single
|

BRIT Awards

Grammy Awards

Ivor Novello Awards 
{| class="wikitable sortable"
|-
! Year  !! Nominee/Work !! Award !! Result
|-
| rowspan=3|2002
| Dido
| Songwriter of the Year
| 
|-
| rowspan=2|"Thank You"
| Most Performed Work
| 
|-
| Best Contemporary Song
| 
|-
| rowspan=2|2004
| rowspan=2|"White Flag"
| Best Song Musically and Lyrically
| 
|-
| International Hit of the Year
| 
|-
| 2019
| Dido
| Outstanding Song Collection
|

MTV Video Music Awards

MTV Europe Music Awards

NRJ Music Awards 

|-
| rowspan=2|2002
| Herself
| International Revelation of the Year
|rowspan=4 
|-
| No Angel
| rowspan=2|International Album of the Year 
|-
| rowspan=2|2004
| Life for Rent
|-
| Herself
| International Female Artist of the Year

World Music Awards 
{| class="wikitable sortable"
|-
! Year !! Award !! Nominee !! Result
|-
| rowspan=3|2002
| rowspan=5|Dido
| World's Best-Selling Adult Contemporary Artist
|rowspan=3 
|-
| World's Best-Selling Pop Female Artist
|-
|rowspan=3|World's Best-Selling British Artist
|-
| 2003
| 
|-
| 2004
|

Žebřík Music Awards 

!Ref.
|-
| rowspan=2|2001
| rowspan=5|Dido
| Best International Surprise
| 
| rowspan=4|
|-
| rowspan=4|Best International Female
| 
|-
| 2002
| 
|-
| 2003
| 
|-
| 2005
| 
|

Others

References

Dido
Awards